Claudio Sebastián Flores (born May 10, 1976) is a Uruguayan former football goalkeeper. He last played for Atlántida Juniors in the Eastern Canelones Regional League.

Flores started his professional career with Peñarol in 1995. During his time with the club he won four Uruguayan Premier division titles in 1995, 1996, 1997 and 1999.

In 2000, Flores joined Lanús in Argentina where he played until the end of 2004. He then had a short spell with Libertad in Paraguay before returning to Peñarol. In 2006, he returned to Lanús but has failed to re-establish himself as the number one goalkeeper. In 2007, he was a non-playing member of the squad that won the Apertura 2007 tournament, Lanús' first ever top flight league title.

Honours

Club
 Peñarol
 Primera División Uruguaya: 1995, 1996, 1997, 1999
 Lanús
 Primera División Argentina: Apertura 2007

External links
 Argentine Primera statistics
 player profile on the Lanús website

1976 births
Living people
Uruguayan footballers
Uruguayan people of Spanish descent
Association football goalkeepers
Uruguay international footballers
1997 FIFA Confederations Cup players
Peñarol players
Club Atlético Lanús footballers
Club Libertad footballers
C.A. Bella Vista players
Uruguayan Primera División players
Argentine Primera División players
Uruguayan expatriate footballers
Expatriate footballers in Argentina
Expatriate footballers in Paraguay